Yavaraté is a town and Department Municipality in the department of Vaupés, in Colombia.  It is located to the south east of the department's capital, Mitú, on the banks on the Vaupés and Maya rivers, on the border with Brazil.  The closest town is Iauaretê, an indigenous village located in Brazil, across the Vaupés River.

Corregimientos of Vaupés Department